The third season of Homicide: Life on the Street aired in the United States on the NBC television network from October 14, 1994, to May 5, 1995, and contained 20 episodes. It was the first full season of episodes. Beginning in the third season, Homicide was moved to Fridays at 10 p.m. EST, a timeslot the show would remain at until its cancellation in 1999.

The third season saw all the original cast members return except for Jon Polito (playing Steve Crosetti), who was reportedly dropped at the request of NBC. Season 3 also marked the debut of character Lt. Megan Russert (Isabella Hofmann), and the final season for both Detectives Beau Felton (Daniel Baldwin) and Stanley Bolander (Ned Beatty).

Celebrities who made guest appearance during the third season include Al Freeman Jr., Steve Buscemi, Tim Russert, Howie Mandel and Chris Noth. As with the previous seasons, Season 3 had several episodes air out of order resulting in continuity issues. To make up for this, the episodes "Crosetti" and "Nothing Personal" included title cards in the beginning to tell the viewers the episodes took place in the past. Season 3 also saw the first crossover between Homicide and Law & Order as Chris Noth makes a cameo appearance as Detective Mike Logan in the episode "Law & Disorder".

The DVD box set of season 3 was released for Region 1 on October 28, 2003. The set includes all 20 season 3 episodes on six discs.

Episodes
When first shown on network television, multiple episodes were aired out of order. The DVD present the episodes in the correct chronological order, restoring all storylines and character developments.

Cast
For the third season of Homicide, almost all the original cast members, including Daniel Baldwin, Ned Beatty, Richard Belzer, Andre Braugher, Clark Johnson, Yaphet Kotto, Melissa Leo, & Kyle Secor, returned. Jon Polito was the only original cast member not to return as NBC reportedly requested that he'd be dropped from the show due to their unhappiness with his physical appearance; Polito's character, Steve Crosetti, would be written out as having gone on vacation to Atlantic City only to commit suicide upon his return to Baltimore. According to an interview in 2005, Polito claimed that when Tom Fontana called him to tell him he was being dropped, he promised Polito would return in the future. However, after Polito refused to believe Fontana and began criticizing the show, the plans were dropped. In the same interview, Polito expressed regret for his comments:.

We had some conflicts on the show. I was also not in the best of shape: I was feeling very passionately about the show, and I was very annoyed about NBC's—what NBC was doing with it. I was very passionate about it. I stepped on the wrong toes. And I made a major mistake. I did not know at the time that Tom Fontana—when Tom Fontana tells you, "You have to be dropped now, but I'll bring you back"—I didn't believe that because I'd been screwed by so many producers over the years. He is a serious man when he says that. I didn't know that. I didn't trust him. So after he said, "NBC wants to get the girl on the show, and they have to replace somebody, and we're gonna choose you, but I'll bring you back in the fall," I instead, very stupidly, went to the newspapers. And I said, rather openly, I said some very vicious comments, both about the way it was being handled by NBC and the way Fontana and Levinson were handling listening to NBC. I was totally wrong because, in fact, the changes they made meant that NBC put it on a better night, and it became a success. But aside from that, I was wrong to jump at Fontana and all that, and not believe in Fontana and Levinson, because they're great people and would've been faithful to me, but I just didn't trust it because I'd been screwed too many times before. I actually said in one newspaper, "The producers of the show are like the people on the Titanic," and the writer said, "You mean they're the captain of the ship?" and I said "No, no. They're on the iceberg saying, 'This way. Come this way.'" That's in print and that was wrong. 

Isabella Hofmann debuted as Lt. (later Captain) Megan Russert. Hofmann was hired reportedly at the request of NBC (specifically Warren Littlefield), who wanted more female characters on the show. Megan Russert was the fictional cousin of NBC Meet the Press moderator Tim Russert and was the first main character not to be based on an officer from the book Homicide: A Year on the Killing Streets. Daniel Baldwin and Ned Beatty both left the show at the conclusion of the season, reportedly due to failed contract negotiations. Both Baldwin and Beatty expressed dissatisfaction with the changes made during the third season, with Baldwin specifically claiming the Beau Felton and Megan Russert extramarital affair was "Typicial TV Chicanery" Baldwin was also burnt out on NBC, saying: "I'd rather do small parts in movies."

Beatty, meanwhile, was frustrated with having to turn down other roles, including the musical Show Boat, due to Homicide, which itself had an uncertain future. Like Baldwin, Beatty also hated the changes made during the third season. Beatty was quoted in the Los Angeles Times:

It wasn't about the money. I loved it in the beginning. Some of it was the best thing I've ever done. But it got to the point where they wanted to see people get shot and car chases and all that. Which is not something homicide detectives do.

Neither would return for the duration of the series; however, both would return for Homicide: The Movie in 2000.

Celebrities who made guest appearances included Al Freeman Jr., who played Deputy Commissioner James C. Harris in "Cradle to the Grave", Steve Buscemi who played Gordon Pratt, the suspect who shot detectives Felton, Howard, & Bolander in "End Game". Tim Russert appeared as himself in "The Old and the Dead". Chris Noth appeared as his Law & Order character Detective Mike Logan in "Law & Disorder", which marked the first time that Homicide and Law & Order crossed over.

Reception

Ratings
Ratings for Season 3 were much lower than the first season. The show ranked at #89 with estimated audience of 8,200,000 which was a drop compared to Season 1 which finished at #24 with an estimated audience of 12,717,000

Awards
The third season of Homicide was the only season to have no Emmy nominations. Despite this, the show did win a Viewers for Quality Television award and a Peabody Award while Andre Braugher won a VQT award for Best Actor in a Quality Drama Series. The show was also nominated for a Writers Guild of America Award for Best Episodic Drama for the episode "Fits Like a Glove".

References

 
 
 

 
1994 American television seasons
1995 American television seasons